Gymnanthemum extensum, also known as bitterleaf tree,  zhan zhi ban jiu ju,  nan chao woei, is a species of flowering shrub of the family Asteraceae.

Distribution

Southern China (Guizhou, Yunnan), the Himalayas (Sikkim, Nepal, Bhutan) and the Shan Hills (Myanmar, Thailand). It has been cultivated in Thailand as a garden tree for the medicinal properties of its leaves and the fragrance of its flowers.

References

External links

Thai Ministry of Agriculture plant information 
Chemical & Pharmaceutical Bulletin 40(2):553-555 · January 1992 - Structures of two new bitter principles isolated from a Thai Medicinal Plant, Vernonia Extensa D.C.

extensum
Flora of Bhutan
Flora of China
Flora of Sikkim
Flora of Myanmar
Flora of Nepal
Medicinal plants of Asia
Plants used in traditional Chinese medicine
Trees of Thailand
Trees of Vietnam